Hequ is a county in the northwest of Shanxi province, China, bordering Shaanxi province to the west and Inner Mongolia to the northwest. It is under the administration of Xinzhou city.

Climate

References

External links
www.xzqh.org 

County-level divisions of Shanxi
Xinzhou